The Art of Sexual Ecstasy: The Path of Sacred Sexuality for Western Lovers is a 1989 book about Tantra by the author Margot Anand, in which the author presents the foundation of her method known as "SkyDancing Tantra". A popular book addressed to a Western audience, it uses concrete sexual exercises to demonstrate the often esoteric principles of Tantra.

Reception
The Art of Sexual Ecstasy was recommended by Linda Devillers in Health.

References

Bibliography
Journals

  

1989 non-fiction books
American non-fiction books
English-language books
Neotantra
Sex manuals
TarcherPerigee books